Andrei Gavrilov (in Russian Андрей Гаврилов; born September 21, 1955) is a Swiss pianist of Russian background.

Early life and music career 
Andrei Gavrilov was born into a family of artists in Moscow. His father was Vladimir Gavrilov (May 30, 1923 – December 4, 1970), one of the eminent Russian painters during the middle of the 20th century, through whom Gavrilov also has German ancestors. His mother was the Armenian pianist Assanetta Eguiserian (December 20, 1925 – November 29, 2006), who had studied with Heinrich Neuhaus and gave Gavrilov his first piano lessons at age 2. In 1961 he was inducted at the Moscow Central Music School and became a student of Tatyana Kestner, who had studied with Alexander Goldenweiser. He completed his studies with another Neuhaus disciple, Lev Naumov, at the Moscow Conservatory. By the age of 18, after one semester at the conservatory, he won the International Tchaikovsky Competition in 1974 and rose to international fame when, at the Salzburg Festival the same year, he substituted for Sviatoslav Richter. Until 1979, Gavrilov performed in all the major music centers of the world performing up to 90 concerts a year, while continuing his studies at the university.

In 1979, at the first peak of Gavrilov's career, Herbert von Karajan, who had heard him in Tchaikovsky's First Concerto in Berlin, offered recordings of all the Rachmaninoff concertos, despite the fact that Karajan only rarely conducted them. In December 1979, recordings were scheduled in Berlin with the Berlin Philharmonic for the 2nd concerto, but Gavrilov did not appear for the rehearsals. It was discovered that due to his critical remarks about the Soviet regime, the head of the KGB and later General Secretary of the Communist Party of the Soviet Union Yuri Andropov, with the approval of Leonid Brezhnev, had seized Gavrilov's passport and the flight ticket and cut his telephone line. Later, by his words, Gavrilov was put virtually under house arrest by the KGB. Militia guarding Gavrilov once showed him an official paper signed by Andropov stating that a fatal accident would not be unwelcome.

Only through Mikhail Gorbachev's eventual intervention did this end in 1984, and Gavrilov received a "free passport", so that he could perform again in the West without having to obtain political asylum. In the following years, he lived in London and in Bad Camberg near Wiesbaden, Germany from 1989 and also assumed German citizenship.

In 1993, he retired from the active cultural scene, cancelled concerts and did not make any further studio recordings. According to an interview with The Guardian: "I wasn't satisfied with myself. In a material sense I was doing very well. But I knew if I was to continue in this way I would never be the artist I dreamed of being - free, original, idealistic, out of the so-called musical industry, which is a contradiction in terms."

The planned two-year sabbatical eventually grew to eight years. At this time he studied the intentions of the composers in their works, religious and philosophical questions, lived half a year in Fiji, and fundamentally reworked his piano technique. In 2001 he moved to Lucerne, Switzerland and resumed concertizing in the 2001/02 season. Since August 2008 he has been living with his second wife and their son in Kanton Zürich.

In 1974 Melodiya recorded the 1st Tchaikovsky Concerto at the prize winner's concert of the Tchaikovsky Competition together with a live solo recital. In 1976 a studio recording of Rachmaninoff's 3rd concerto followed. From 1977 to 1989 he worked exclusively for EMI. From that time comes the legendary recording of the Chopin Études and many other works, notably by Chopin, Scriabin, Prokofiev, Rachmaninoff and J. S. Bach. From 1991 to 1993 he recorded for Deutsche Grammophon, where he also duplicated some works already recorded for EMI. A number of projects, many with recordings new to Gavrilov's discography, were announced in 1992 but not realized: Bach's English Suites, the complete Beethoven piano concerti, the Choral Fantasia and the Diabelli Variations, as well as vaguer plans for works by Liszt (Transcendental Etudes, Paganini Etudes), Ravel's complete works for piano solo and with orchestra, and the piano concertos of Grieg and Schumann.
 
In 2012 Andrei Gavrilov held master classes for the first time, in Madrid and later in London. In 2013 he completed writing his three volume autobiography, the first volume of which was published in Russian and German in March and April 2014, and in English in December 2016.  He also made his first new recording for 20 years: a CD of Chopin Nocturnes, which was done specially to be included with each copy of the book.

In April 2013 Andrei Gavrilov performed a concert in Belgrade playing and conducting three romantic concertos in one evening, with a full symphony orchestra. He played another concert conducting two romantic concertos from the piano in Bristol in May 2014.

Complete discography 
If not stated otherwise, recordings up to 1976 are released on Melodiya, those from 1977 to 1989 on EMI (in the beginning as a co-production with Melodiya), those from 1991 to 1993 on Deutsche Grammophon.

1974 
Tchaikovsky: Piano Concerto No. 1; with USSR State Radio and Television Symphony Orchestra conducted by Dmitri Kitaenko (Final concert International Tchaikovsky Competition 1974 live).
Haydn: Sonata E-flat major Hob. XVI/52; Scriabin: Etude op. 42/5; Liszt: La Campanella; Tchaikovsky: Variations op. 19/6; Ravel: Pavane pour une infante défunte; Scarbo from Gaspard de la nuit. Live (Tchaikovsky-Variations live from the Tchaikovsky Competition).

1976 
Rachmaninoff: Piano Concerto No. 3; with ad hoc-orchestra consisting of members of the Moscow Philharmonic Orchestra and the USSR State Symphony Orchestra conducted by Alexander Lazarev

1977 
Prokofiev: Piano Concerto No. 1; 2 Pieces from Romeo and Juliet. Ravel: Piano Concerto for the Left Hand; Pavane pour une infante défunte. Concertos with London Symphony Orchestra conducted by Simon Rattle.
Ravel: Gaspard de la nuit. Prokofiev: Suggestion diabolique. Liszt: La Campanella. Tchaikovsky: Variations, Op. 19/6. Balakirev: Islamey.
Tchaikovsky: Piano Concerto No. 1; with Philharmonia Orchestra conducted by Riccardo Muti.
 Shostakovich: Violin Sonata, Op. 134. With Gidon Kremer (live Great Hall of the Moscow Conservatory). Melodiya.

1979 
Handel: Suites HWV 426, 429, 431, 432, 436, 437, 440, 447 (live from the Tours Festival on Chateau de Marcilly-sur-Maulne; the other suites were played by Sviatoslav Richter).
Prokofiev: 10 Pieces from Romeo and Juliet; Piano Sonata No. 8.
Weber: Grand Duo Concertant, Op 48; Hindemith: Violin Sonata, Op. 11; Schnittke: Violin Sonata No. 2. With Gidon Kremer.

1981 
Beethoven: Piano Concerto No. 3, with USSR State Symphony Orchestra conducted by Yuri Temirkanov. Live, Melodiya.
Weber: Grand Duo Concertant, Op. 48; Brahms: Clarinet Trio, Op 114; Berg: 4 Pieces for Clarinet and Piano. With Ivan Monighetti, Violoncello, Anatoly Kamishev, Clarinet. Melodiya.

1982 
J. S. Bach: Piano Concertos BWV 1052-1058, with Moscow Chamber Orchestra conducted by Yuri Nikolaevsky. Melodiya

1983 
Mozart: Piano Concerto No. 10; Mendelssohn: Concerto for 2 Pianos in E major. With Dang Thai Son, 2nd piano, Moscow Chamber Orchestra conducted by Pavel Kogan. Melodiya.

1984 
J. S. Bach: French Suites.
 Rachmaninoff: Selections from Morceaux de Fantaisie, Op. 3, Moments Musicaux, Op, 16, Preludes, Op. 23, Preludes, Op. 32, Études-Tableaux, Op. 39.
Scriabin: Sonata No. 4; Selection of Preludes Opp. 9/1; 11/2, 4–6, 8-14, 16, 18, 20, 22, 24; 13/1-3; 15/1, 5; 16/2, 4; Etude, Op. 42/5.

1984/1985 
Chopin: Piano Sonata No. 2; Ballades No. 1, No. 2, No. 3, No. 4

1985/1987 
Chopin: Etudes, Opp. 10, 25.

1986 
J. S. Bach: Piano Concertos BWV 1052–1058, with Academy of St Martin in the Fields conducted by Neville Marriner.
Rachmaninoff: Piano Concerto No. 3, with Philadelphia Orchestra conducted by Riccardo Muti.

1987 
Schumann: Papillons, Carnaval, Faschingsschwank aus Wien.

1988 
Mozart: Piano Sonata No. 11 and No. 12, ; Fantasia, K.397; Prelude and Fugue K.394.
Tchaikovsky: Piano Concerto No. 1 and No. 3, with Berlin Philharmonic Orchestra conducted by Vladimir Ashkenazy (live).

1989 
Rachmaninoff: Piano Concerto No. 2; Rhapsody on a Theme of Paganini; with Philadelphia Orchestra conducted by Riccardo Muti.
 Rachmaninoff: Piano Concerto No. 2; with Royal Philharmonic Orchestra conducted by Vladimir Ashkenazy (live in Moscow)
Stravinsky: Concerto for Two Pianos; The Rite of Spring; Scherzo; Sonata for Two Pianos, with Vladimir Ashkenazy, Decca Records

1991 
Chopin: Piano Sonata No. 2; 4 Ballades
Prokofiev: Piano Sonatas No. 3, No. 7, No. 8
Schubert: Impromptus D. 899 and 935

1992: 
J. S. Bach: Goldberg Variations
Britten: Friday Afternoons, Op. 7, Golden Vanity, Op. 78 (both with Wiener Sängerknaben); Sailing, Night, Ballad of Little Musgrave and Lady Barnard (all from Holiday Suite, Op. 5).
Prokofiev: 10 Pieces from Romeo und Juliet; Suggestion diabolique. Prelude, Op 12/7. Ravel: Gaspard de la Nuit; Pavane pour une infante défunte.

1993 
J. S. Bach: French Suites.
Grieg: Lyric Pieces, Opp. 12/1; 38/1; 43/1, 2, 6; 47/2-4; 54/1-5; 57/6; 62/4; 65/5-6; 68/3,5; 71/1-3, 6-7

1999 
Chopin: Piano Sonata No. 2; Ballades No. 1 and 4; Etudes Opp. 10/3-5, 9, 12. Live at Maulbronn Abbey, K&K Verlagsanstalt.

2014 
Chopin: 9 Nocturnes, No.1 in B flat minor, Op.9/1; No.8 in D flat major, Op.27/2; No.20 in C sharp minor, Op.posth.; No.5 in F sharp major, Op.15/2; No.9 in B major, Op.32/1; No.4 in F major, Op.15/1; No.15 in F minor, Op.55/1; No.10 in A flat major, Op.32/2; No.13 in C minor, Op.48/1 (recording: 17.5.2013 Fazioli Hall, Sacile, Italy)

2018

Modest Mussorgsky: "Pictures at an exhibition". UCM records. "Unzipped Classical Music". New private Andrei Gavrilov own label.

2020

Robert Schumann : "Symphonic Etudes" op 13, "Papillons" op 2
UCM records. "Unzipped Classical Music". Private Andrei Gavrilov own label.

TV and radio broadcasts and other recordings

TV 
1979
Shostakovich: Sonata for Violin and Piano. Weber: Grand Duo Concertant, Op 48; Adagio from Violin Sonata, Op 10/2. Rossini: Andante con Variazione. With Gidon Kremer, violin. WDR/EMI Laserdisc

1989
 Rachmaninoff: Piano Concerto No. 2; with Royal Philharmonic Orchestra conducted by Vladimir Ashkenazy (live in Moscow) BBC/EMI VHS

1990 
Prokofiev: Suggestion diabolique; "Montagues and Capulets" (from: 10 Pieces from Romeo and Juliet ); Piano Sonata No. 8. Gavrilov also speaks about the works with British Composer Michael Berkeley in English, subtitles in German. Südwestfunk.
Rachmaninoff: Moment musical, Op. 16/3; Elegy, Op. 3/1. Südwestfunk.
Scriabin: Prelude, Op. 9; 4th piano sonata; Etude, Op. 42/5. Südwestfunk

2000
J.S. Bach: Well-Tempered Clavier, Book No. 1, Preludes & Fugues No.s 1-12. BBC Wales/Euroarts DVD

2020
Japan recital: Tokyo, https://www.youtube.com/watch?v=Y7NigtcQ1OE

Radio 
2009
Chopin: Nocturnes, Opp. 9/1, 27/2, posth., 15/2, 32/1, 15/1, 55/1, 32/2. Prokofiev: Piano Sonata No. 8; Suggestion diabolique, Op. 4/4. Scarlatti: Sonata in D minor, L.366/K.1. Hessischer Rundfunk live.

Other recordings 
2006
Chopin: Nocturnes, Opp. 9/1, posth., 15/2, 15/1, 55/1, 32/2, 48/1. Live from the Lucerne Festival.

References

External links 

 Official Website

1955 births
Living people
Russian classical pianists
Male classical pianists
Russian people of Armenian descent
Armenian musicians
Moscow Conservatory alumni
Prize-winners of the International Tchaikovsky Competition